Vlatko Blažević (born 23 October 1994) is a Croatian football player that currently plays for NK Zadar.

References

m.sibenik.in
zadarskilist.hr
zadarski.slobodnadalmacija.hr

External links
Statistics at Sportmanager.hr

1994 births
Living people
Croatian footballers
Croatian expatriate footballers
Sportspeople from Zadar
Association football forwards
NK Zadar players
HNK Šibenik players
NK Inter Zaprešić players
U.S. 1913 Seregno Calcio players
NK Kustošija players
A.S.D. Martina Calcio 1947 players
Croatian Football League players
First Football League (Croatia) players
Serie D players
Croatian expatriate sportspeople in Italy
Expatriate footballers in Italy